

The Arctiini are a tribe of tiger moths in the family Erebidae.

Systematics
The tribe was previously treated as a higher-level taxon, the subfamily Arctiinae, within the lichen and tiger moth family, Arctiidae. The ranks of the family and its subdivisions were lowered in a recent reclassification while keeping the contents of the family and its subdivisions largely unchanged. These changes in rank triggered changes in the suffixes in the names. The subfamily Arctiinae as a whole was reclassified as the subfamily Arctiinae within the family Erebidae. The original subfamily Arctiinae was lowered to tribe status as Arctiini, and its original tribes were lowered to subtribe status by changing the -ini suffix to -ina (e.g., Callimorphini became Callimorphina). Thus, the name "Arctiinae" used to refer to only a subgroup of the entire group of lichen and tiger moths, but now it refers to the entire group.

Subtribes (former tribes)
Many genera in the tribe have been classified into the following subtribes, while the others are incertae sedis.
Arctiina
Callimorphina
Ctenuchina
Euchromiina
Micrarctiina
Nyctemerina
Pericopina
Phaegopterina
Spilosomina
Incertae sedis

A note by Vladimir Viktorovitch Dubatolov 

Generic composition of Arctiinae have been stated in main species catalogs of this subfamily: Nearctic (Ferguson & Opler, 2006), Neotropical (Watson & Goodger, 1986), Eurasia (Dubatolov & de Vos, 2010), Australia (Edwards, 1996), with additions and corrections by Dubatolov, Afrotropical (Goodger & Watson, 1995 with later additions and corrections by Dubatolov). Many problematic genera were placed in correct tribes or different subfamilies in these catalogs.

Some notable taxa
Eupseudosoma involuta (Sepp, 1855)
Halysidota leda (Druce, 1880)
Halysidota leda leda
Halysidota leda enricoi Toulgoët, 1978
Halysidota schausi Rothschild, 1909
Hypercompe icasia (Cramer, 1777)
Opharus bimaculata (Dewitz, 1877)
Pachydota albiceps (Walker, 1856)
Pseudamastus alsa (Druce, 1890)
Pseudamastus alsa alsa
Pseudamastus alsa lalannei Toulgoët, 1985
Utetheisa ornatrix (Linnaeus, 1758)
Utetheisa pulchella (Linnaeus, 1758)

References

Main species catalogs
 Dubatolov, V. V. (2010). "Tiger-moths of Eurasia (Lepidoptera, Arctiidae) (Nyctemerini by Rob de Vos & Vladimir V. Dubatolov)". Neue Entomologische Nachrichten. 65: 1-106.
 Edwards, E. D. (1996). "Arctiidae". Monographs on Australian Lepidoptera 4: 278-286, 368-370
 Ferguson, D. C. & Opler, P. A. (2006). "Checklist of the Arctiidae (Lepidoptera: Insecta) of the continental United States and Canada". Zootaxa 1299: 1-33.
 Goodger, D. T. & Watson, A. (1995). The afrotropical tiger-moths. An illustrated catalogue, with generic diagnosis and species distribution, of the afrotropical arctiinae (Lepidoptera: arctiidae). Apollo Books Aps.: Stenstrup, Denmark, 55 pp.
 Watson, A. (1971). "An illustrated Catalog of the Neotropic Arctiinae type in the United States National Museum (Lepidoptera: Arctiidae) Part 1". Smithsonian Contributions to Zoology. 50: 1-361.
 Watson, A. & Goodger, D. T. (1986). "Catalogue of the Neotropical Tiger-moths". Occasional Papers on Systematic Entomology. 1: 1-71.

External links

 
Arctiinae
Moth tribes